

Unstone is a village and civil parish in the English county of Derbyshire, in the North East Derbyshire administrative district approximately  south east of Dronfield. It is also close to the town of Chesterfield. The River Drone and the Midland Main Line railway run through the village, which has a population of over 1,000, increasing to 1,876 and including Apperknowle at the time of the 2011 Census.

Originally, Unstone Main Colliery was the primary source of employment for the village; it was the largest colliery of the group around Unstone. It was served by a Midland Railway branch line which connected it to the main line in Dronfield and Sheepbridge. Although it ceased working around 1900, there are significant remains in the woodland area of both the railway and mine coal mines.

Unstone community centre is built on the former trackbed of the Midland branch next to the former overbridge on Crow Lane.

The village has more than doubled in size over the past century. A modern housing estate, Unstone Green, was built at the other side of the railway line from the original village. The majority of the estate, which was built in the 1940s, was initially intended to be temporary housing for the many coal miners in the area, but it is still intact today.
Originally on the A61 trunk road, the village is now bypassed by the Unstone-Dronfield Bypass dual carriageway.

The village has two schools: Unstone St Mary's Infant School on Crow Lane and Unstone Junior School on Main Road.

The village has a parish council. Unstone Grange, run by a registered charity is a retreat that describes itself as "a centre for personal creative growth."

There are bus services to Chesterfield, Sheffield and Holmesfield.

The village used to be served by the now-closed Unstone railway station.

Landmarks are a TV transmitter and a railway viaduct. There is one public house, the Horse and Jockey. The village post office closed in 2019.

See also 
Listed buildings in Unstone
List of places in Derbyshire

References

External links

Villages in Derbyshire
North East Derbyshire District